Tymovsky District is an administrative district (raion) of Sakhalin Oblast, Russia; one of the seventeen in the oblast. Municipally, it is incorporated as Tymovsky Urban Okrug. It is located in the center of the Island of Sakhalin. Its administrative center is the urban locality (an urban-type settlement) of Tymovskoye. Population:  The population of Tymovskoye accounts for 48.5% of the district's total population.

Geography
The Tym River passes through the district  in a roughly south-north direction.

References

Notes

Sources

Districts of Sakhalin Oblast

